Serine palmitoyltransferase, long chain base subunit 2, also known as SPTLC2, is a protein which in humans is encoded by the SPTLC2 gene. SPTLC2 belongs to the class-II pyridoxal-phosphate-dependent aminotransferase family.

Function 
SPTLC2 encodes a long chain base subunit of serine palmitoyltransferase (SPT). The heterodimer formed with LCB1/SPTLC1 constitutes the catalytic core. It catalyzes the pyridoxal 5'-phosphate dependent condensation of L-serine with an acyl-CoA thioester to yield an amino alcohol. The composition of the SPT complex determines the substrate preference. The SPTLC1-SPTLC2-SPTSSA complex shows a strong preference for C16-CoA substrate, while the SPTLC1-SPTLC2-SPTSSB complex displays a preference for C18-CoA substrate.

The SPT complex synthesizes molecules used in various biological processes. For example, sphingosine, an 18-carbon amino alcohol with an unsaturated hydrocarbon chain, can be phosphorylated via sphingosine kinase. The resulting sphingosine-1-phosphate is a potent signaling lipid. Sphingosine is also a substrate for the synthesis of various other molecules including, ceramides, sphingomyelin, cerebrosides and globosides.  

Epidermal ceramides are critical for normal skin barrier function and SPTLC2 is differentially expressed across body sites to regulate epidermal ceramide composition. In particular, SPTLC2 is upregulated in acral granular layer keratinocytes.

Tissue distribution 
SPTLC2 is widely expressed in all tissues.

Clinical significance 
Mutations in SPTLC2 were identified in patients with hereditary sensory neuropathy type I. 

In response to IL-17A and TNF, SPTLC2 is highly upregulated in psoriasis and is likely responsible for some of the epidermal ceramide alterations seen in psoriasis plaques.

Alternatively spliced variants encoding different isoforms of SPTLC2 have been identified.

SPTLC2 expression is highly increased at the protein level in brains of patients with Alzheimer's disease. No changes are observed at the mRNA level.

References

Further reading